Toshi Sinha (Hindi: Tōśī Sinhā), is an Indian voice actress who specializes for dubbing foreign productions as a self-employed freelance dubbing artist.

Dubbing career
She has dubbed for South Indian film and Hollywood actresses. Her foreign content that would go on Discovery Channel, Disney Channel, Cartoon Network, Pogo, Nickelodeon and UTV.

She is the Hindi voice of Robin Wright as Claire Underwood in House of Cards.

Dubbing roles

Live action television series

Animated series

Live action films

Indian films

Hollywood films

Animated films

See also
List of Indian dubbing artists

References

External links
 

Actresses from Mumbai
Living people
Indian voice actresses
Year of birth missing (living people)
Actresses in Hindi television
Actresses in Hindi cinema
21st-century Indian actresses